María Ofelia Navarrete (also known as María Chichilco) is a Salvadoran politician and ex-combatant. She was appointed to the position of Minister of Local Development by President Nayib Bukele in May of 2019.

Early life 
Navarette began her career early on in her life. At the age of 12, she worked in the house of the Health Minister of El Salvador. While there, she befriended the child of the person she worked for. He spoke in favor of the revolutionary ideas associated with the FMLN movement of the time, inspiring her and her future political endeavors. In 1979, Navarette had to flee her home with her husband and children due to the escalation of the civil war. There she lived for 12 years, as she joined the guerilla movement alongside her husband. During her time as a guerilla combatant, she served a logistics coordinator for the movement. She also helped administer the clandestine hospitals which gave medical attention to combatants who suffered injuries during the armed conflict.

Role in FMLN 
Navarette joined the FMLN in 1980. At the age of 24, she helped organize the Field Work Unit (UTC) which was a union made for field workers. After the signing of the Chapultepec Peace Accords in 1992, Navarette became a deputy in the legislative assembly for the leftist party from 1994 to 1997. Later in her career, she assumed the role of Vice Minister under the presidency of Mauricio Funes, from 2009 to 2004. Navarette served as the coordinator for the FMLN party in Chalatenango, where she also served as the vice governor. Her role as coordinator was the last position she assumed for the FMLN party. Navarette was discharged from her position due to the critiques she expressed while working for the party. Her main critique was that the FMLN lost sight of their original initiative when the party was founded, which was grounded in giving back to the people.

Construction of Bridge Maria Chichilco 
Navarette served an important role in the construction of a bridge over the Torola River, in the department of Morazan, El Salvador. The bridge Maria Chichilco, named after Navarette's pseudonym, was inaugurated on 30 December 2019. This project was significant for the inhabitants of the municipals San Isidro and Torola, as the nearby residents had been asking for this public works project to be built for years. Under her role as the Minister of Local Development, the area of the Torola river was the first which Navarette visited. The project cost more than $1 million dollars which went into the construction of the bridge structure, which has a walkway and a one lane road, as well as a paved road from the nearby highway to the sight of the bridge. On 25 August 2020, the bridge was reported to be damaged. Strong rains and significant water elevation damaged one of the entrances of the bridge. Critics may point that the original structure was not technically adequate enough.

References 

Year of birth missing (living people)
Living people
Government ministers of El Salvador
Women government ministers of El Salvador
Farabundo Martí National Liberation Front politicians
Nuevas Ideas politicians